Shao Changchun (Simplified Chinese: 邵常淳; born February 1965) in Nanning, is an unaffiliated event organizer, violin maker, and academician (Academy of Sciences and Arts). He has contributed to international art exchanges to promote artistic cooperation between China and foreign countries.

References

1965 births
Living people
Chinese curators
Bowed string instrument makers